The 1806 United States House of Representatives election in Delaware was held on October 7, 1806, to elect the U.S. representative from Delaware's at-large congressional district. Incumbent Federalist James M. Broom faced re-election to a full term after winning the previous year's special election. He was challenged by three Democratic-Republicans.

Broom was re-elected with over 60% of the vote, with neither opponent coming close to unseating him.

Results

Results by county

References

See also 
 1807 Delaware's at-large congressional district special election
 1806 and 1807 United States House of Representatives elections
 List of United States representatives from Delaware

1806
Delaware
United States House of Representatives